Atouguia is a civil parish in the municipality of Ourém, Portugal. The population in 2011 was 2,454, in an area of 19.55 km².

References

Freguesias of Ourém